The Râul Mic is the left headwater of the river Cugir in Romania. At its confluence with the Râul Mare in the town Cugir, the river Cugir is formed.

Tributaries
The following rivers are tributaries to the Râul Mic (from source to mouth):
Left: Scârna, Tisa, Arieș, Valea Prihodiștei, Brădet
Right: Răchita

References 

Rivers of Alba County
Rivers of Romania